Syahrul Yasin Limpo is an Indonesian politician, who has served as Minister of Agriculture in Joko Widodo's Onward Cabinet since 23 October 2019. He was governor of South Sulawesi from 2008 to 2018.

In 2016, Limpo ran for the leadership of Golkar Party but lost to Setya Novanto. After a 2017 meeting with Imam Muhammad ibn Saud Islamic University rector Sulaiman ibn Abdullah Abalkhail, Limpo helped facilitate the opening of a Saudi-funded university in South Sulawesi.

In 2017, Limpo oversaw a controversial project in the province to create five artificial islands in order to increase public space at Makassar. Opposition came from environmental organizations which filed a lawsuit and local fishermen who attempted to physically block the construction, claiming the project would deplete fish stocks.

He moved from Golkar to Nasdem in March 2018.

References

Governors of South Sulawesi
Hasanuddin University alumni
Indonesian Muslims
Golkar politicians
Nasdem Party politicians
Onward Indonesia Cabinet

Living people
1955 births
People from Makassar
Agriculture ministers of Indonesia